Studeriotes longiramosa, also known as Christmas tree coral, is a species of soft coral in the family Paralcyoniidae.

References 

Paralcyoniidae
Animals described in 1910